Catherine Allison Russo (born October 1976) is an American healthcare consultant and Democratic politician currently serving as the Minority Leader of the Ohio House of Representatives. Russo represents the 7th district, which consists of portions of Columbus, and Upper Arlington in Franklin County. Russo was the Democratic Party nominee for the 2021 Ohio's 15th congressional district special election.

Ohio House of Representatives

Election
Russo faced off against Republican candidate Erik Yassenoff in the general election on November 6, 2018. She was elected with 57 percent of the vote, flipping the seat from Republican control to Democratic control. In 2020, she successfully defended her seat against Republican Pat Manley, increasing her win by 1 percentage point with 58% of the vote.

Committees
Russo serves on the following committees: Health; State and Local Government; Finance; Finance Subcommittee on Health and Human Services; Families, Aging Human Services.

2021 congressional campaign
Russo defeated Greg Betts in a primary election in August 2021 to be the Democratic nominee for the special election in Ohio's 15th congressional district. Her Republican opponent for the November 2021 special election was Mike Carey. Although she lost the race, she won a greater vote share than any Democrat in that district since it was drawn in 2012.

Electoral history

References

External links
 
 
 Profile from the Ohio Statehouse Museum

|-

1976 births
21st-century American politicians
21st-century American women politicians
Candidates in the 2021 United States elections
George Washington University alumni
Living people
Russo, Allison
Mississippi University for Women alumni
People from Lafayette County, Mississippi
People from Upper Arlington, Ohio
University of Alabama at Birmingham alumni
Women state legislators in Ohio